Pseudorbilia is a genus of fungi in the family Orbiliaceae consisting only of the species Pseudorbilia bipolaris.

References
http://www.indexfungorum.org

Helotiales
Monotypic fungi genera
Helotiales genera